Bethany LeSueur (born January 6, 1983) is a former Long Island high school basketball player. A six-year starter at guard for Garden City High School, LeSueur compiled a record of 121–12, a .910 winning percentage. LeSueur led her team to three state final fours, three Long Island Championships, three Nassau County Championships, and six Conference Championships.  LeSueur was a scoring machine compiling 38 games of 30+ points. Bethany LeSueur was twice named Gatorade Player of the Year, for New York (2000, 2001) as well as Miss New York Basketball (2001). She was a Street & Smith All-American, USA Today All-American, and also started in the Nike-WBCA All America Game. LeSueur holds the Long Island scoring record (male or female) with 3,167 points.

LeSueur was a three-sport athlete at Garden City where she also competed for the lacrosse and soccer teams. She was named First Team All-State in soccer and was All-County twice. Off the court, Bethany was a member of the National Honor Society and a Merit Scholar. LeSueur is the only athlete to have her number retired from Garden City High School.

College 
Bethany LeSueur was a 3-year starter at Georgetown University as well as a two-year team captain. In three years for the Hoyas, she is one of only seven players in Georgetown history to record over 800 points, 200 assists and 400 rebounds. She also received honors such as Defensive Player of the Year for the Hoyas and the Patricia E. Corace Hustle Award. Additionally, LeSueur was the team MVP for Georgetown for the 2005–2006 season. LeSueur was in the top ten in steals in the Big East her junior and senior seasons. She was also in the top 3 in over 5 statistical categories for the Hoyas.

Virginia and Georgetown statistics

Source

Post Playing Career 
Bethany LeSueur currently resides in Garden City with a husband Tom Hughes, a former member of The University of Scranton Men's Basketball and Lacrosse Team. She is a Business Education teacher at East Meadow High School as well as the Girls Varsity Basketball Coach. LeSueur also serves as the Director of Female Programs for the Rising Stars Organization and head female trainer for Pro Hoops, Inc.

References 

 

 

1983 births
Basketball players from New York (state)
High school basketball coaches in the United States
Living people
American women's basketball coaches
American women's basketball players
Garden City High School (New York) alumni
Georgetown University alumni
Georgetown Hoyas women's basketball players
People from Garden City, New York
Schoolteachers from New York (state)
American women educators
Sportspeople from Nassau County, New York
Guards (basketball)